Bonnycastle may refer to:

 Bonnycastle, Louisville, a neighborhood near downtown Louisville, Kentucky
 Bonnycastle family of Canada